Ryan James Kesler (born August 31, 1984) is an American former professional ice hockey center. Selected in the first round, 23rd overall, by the Vancouver Canucks in the 2003 NHL Entry Draft, Kesler spent the first ten years of his National Hockey League (NHL) career with the Canucks. He was traded to the Anaheim Ducks on June 27, 2014. He is best known for being a two-way forward and his agitating style of play, winning the Selke Trophy in 2011.

Kesler played junior hockey with the U.S. National Team Development Program from which he then accepted a scholarship to play college hockey with the Ohio State Buckeyes of the Central Collegiate Hockey Association (CCHA). In one season with the Buckeyes, he was an honorable mention for the CCHA All-Rookie Team and was named CCHA Rookie of the Week three times and CCHA Rookie of the Month once.  In addition to the U.S. National Team Development Program and the Ohio State Buckeyes, Kesler has also suited up for the Manitoba Moose of the American Hockey League (AHL), where he was named to the 2005 AHL All-Star Game.

Kesler has represented the United States at seven International Ice Hockey Federation-sanctioned events, winning one World U18 Championship gold medal, one World Junior Championships gold medal, one 2010 Winter Olympics silver medal, and one 2001 World U-17 Hockey Challenge, gold medal.

Early life
Ryan Kesler was born on August 31, 1984, in Livonia, Michigan, to Linda and Mike Kesler. He is the youngest of three children, after brother Todd and sister Jenny. His father, Mike, played college hockey at Colorado College and was a supervisor with the Blue Cross and Blue Shield Association for 37 years. He introduced his children to the ice at a very young age; Ryan recalls skating at around age four. Mike also coaches a Junior B hockey team and runs a hockey school in Livonia, which Kesler attended as a child every summer from the age of six to seventeen. In April 2007, Mike was diagnosed with carcinoid cancer and had seven inches of his small intestine removed in order to be rid of it.

Kesler played minor ice hockey in Detroit for teams such as Compuware, Honeybaked and Little Caesars of the Midwest Elite Hockey League (MWEHL). He played in the 1998 Quebec International Pee-Wee Hockey Tournament with the Little Caesars team. Around age 13, Kesler was cut from every AAA team he tried out for. Consequently, he played for his dad's Livonia Hockey Association bantam team, which he coached. Kesler credits his brother, who is nine years older than him, for getting him into hockey. During his minor career, he established a lasting friendship with Chris Conner, who went on to be drafted by the Dallas Stars.

Despite growing up in Michigan, he was a Minnesota North Stars fan. As a young hockey player, Kesler looked up to North Stars center and fellow Livonia native Mike Modano as a role model. He has also listed Joe Sakic of the Quebec Nordiques and Colorado Avalanche as a favorite player during his childhood.

Playing career

Early career
In June 2000, Kesler was drafted in the fifth round, 89th overall, by the Brampton Battalion in the Ontario Hockey League (OHL) Priority Selection. Despite being drafted by a Canadian OHL team, Kesler chose to play in the U.S. National Team Development Program (USNTDP) because of its close proximity to Livonia. This allowed Kesler to continue his high school education without leaving Winston Churchill High School. He entered the USNTDP for the 2000–01 season. Over his two seasons with the USNTDP, Kesler recorded 99 points in 131 games.

After two seasons with the USNTDP, Kesler accepted a scholarship to play college hockey at Ohio State University for the Ohio State Buckeyes of the Central Collegiate Hockey Association (CCHA). He chose Ohio State over the University of Wisconsin–Madison and its Wisconsin Badgers ice hockey program of the Western Collegiate Hockey Association (WCHA) because Ohio State was closer to Kesler's home in Livonia. As a freshman, Kesler scored 11 goals and 20 assists to finish fourth in team scoring behind junior and Hobey Baker Award finalist R. J. Umberger. Over the course of his freshman year, Kesler helped the Buckeyes to a third-place finish in the CCHA's regular season standings. At the 2003 CCHA Tournament, Kesler scored two goals as the Buckeye's finished in fourth place, losing to Northern Michigan 4–1 in the third-place game. Despite this finish, Ohio State secured an at-large bid to the 2003 NCAA Men's Division I Ice Hockey Tournament, the third appearance at the NCAA Men's Ice Hockey Championship in Ohio State's history. At the tournament, Ohio State suffered a 1–0 loss to Boston College in the opening round of the East Regional at the Dunkin' Donuts Center in Providence, Rhode Island, ending both the team's and Kesler's season.

Kesler's play as a freshman earned him an honorable mention for the CCHA All-Rookie Team. He was also named CCHA Rookie of the Week three times, CCHA Rookie of the Month once, and was awarded Ohio State's George Burke Most Valuable Freshman award. Following the season, Kesler entered the 2003 NHL Entry Draft ranked sixteenth overall among North American skaters. On June 21, 2003, he was drafted 23rd overall by the Vancouver Canucks.

Upon being drafted, Kesler considered returning to Ohio State for his sophomore season or joining the Brampton Battalion, who still held his OHL rights. However, less than two months after being drafted, Kesler signed a three-year, $2.475-million entry level contract with the Canucks, complemented by an $850,000 signing bonus. After attending Canucks training camp and playing in five preseason games, Kesler was cut by the Canucks and sent to their American Hockey League (AHL) affiliate, the Manitoba Moose. Kesler began his first professional season with the Moose, but was recalled by the Canucks in November and made his NHL debut on November 24, 2003, in a 2–1 loss to the Toronto Maple Leafs, recording one shot on goal and 12:12 of ice time. He scored his first career NHL goal on November 29 against Calgary Flames goaltender Jamie McLennan in a 4–4 tie. For the remainder of the season, Kesler split time between the Canucks and the Moose, finishing his season with 5 points in 28 Canucks games and 11 points in 33 Moose games.

The 2004–05 NHL lockout, which cancelled the full 2004–05 NHL season, forced Kesler to spend the entire season with the Moose. With Manitoba, Kesler emerged as one of the Canucks' top prospects. Midway through the season, Kesler was named to the PlanetUSA All-Star team for the 2005 AHL All-Star Game where he helped PlanetUSA defeat Team Canada for the first time in five years. Kesler finished third in team scoring with thirty goals and 57 points to be named the Moose's Most Valuable Player. Kesler added an additional nine points in fourteen playoff games as the Moose advanced to the Western Conference finals before being swept by the Chicago Wolves.

Vancouver Canucks (2003–2014)

2005–2008

When the NHL lockout ended and play resumed for the 2005–06 NHL season, Kesler joined the Canucks for his first full season with the team, playing in all 82 games and finishing the season with 23 points. With his entry-level contract expiring in the off-season, Kesler rejected a $564,000 qualifying offer from the Canucks before becoming a restricted free agent on July 1, 2006. Unable to come to terms on a new deal with the Canucks, Kesler signed a one-year, $1.9-million offer sheet with the Philadelphia Flyers on September 12. The offer sheet from Flyers general manager Bobby Clarke was the first in the NHL since the Tampa Bay Lightning extended one to Brett Hauer in July 1999. The move was highly controversial, with many NHL general managers criticizing how Kesler's inflated salary would affect future free agent signings. The Canucks had one week to either match the offer or receive a second round draft pick from the Flyers in 2007 as compensation. Two days after the signing, the Canucks matched the Flyers' offer.

After playing 48 games in the 2006–07 NHL season, Kesler suffered a torn acetabular labrum and missed the remainder of the regular season, finishing the season with 16 points. Kesler returned to the Canucks lineup for the first game of their quarterfinal playoff series against the Dallas Stars. While blocking a shot in the fourth overtime of the game, Kesler was re-injured, suffering a displaced index finger. Despite finishing the game, Kesler was forced to undergo surgery to repair the damage and missed the remainder of the playoffs. In the off-season, the Canucks re-signed Kesler to a three-year, $5.25 million contract extension on May 24, 2007. In comparison to his previous contract, facilitated by the Flyers' offer sheet, the deal represented a $150,000 pay cut in terms of average annual salary.

Early into his fourth season with the Canucks, Kesler was cross-checked in the face by Flyers forward Jesse Boulerice. The cross-check was an immediate response to Kesler hitting Flyers defenseman Randy Jones and resulted in Kesler leaving the game with a sore jaw. Boulerice was subsequently suspended for 25 games, matching the then largest suspension in NHL history. Later in the season, Kesler was involved in another violent on-ice incident when Anaheim Ducks defenseman Chris Pronger used his skate blade to stomp on Kesler's calf. Kesler was not injured on the play. Although the NHL originally announced Pronger would not receive a suspension on the play, he later received an eight-game suspension when new video emerged of the incident. Over the course of the season, Kesler established himself as a solid two-way center, scoring what was then a career-high 21 goals and 37 points and playing a regular shutdown role against opposing teams' top players and on the penalty kill with linemate Alexandre Burrows.

2008–2014

With the departures of Markus Näslund, Brendan Morrison and Trevor Linden following the 2007–08 season, the Canucks were left without any captains for the 2008–09 NHL season. On September 30, 2008, Kesler was announced as a Canucks alternate captain with Willie Mitchell and Mattias Öhlund, while Canucks goaltender Roberto Luongo was named captain. While he at first continued to play on the third line in a largely defensive role with Burrows, head coach Alain Vigneault eventually split the duo in the midst of a poor January for the team. As a result, Kesler was placed on the second line with free agent acquisitions Pavol Demitra and Mats Sundin. Playing in a more offensive role, he set then-personal bests for the 2008–09 season, with 26 goals, 33 assists and 59 points. As a result, he was awarded the Cyclone Taylor Award as team MVP ahead of higher-profile teammates Luongo and Daniel and Henrik Sedin. Kesler gained additional recognition on a league-wide basis as a Frank J. Selke Trophy finalist along with Pavel Datsyuk of the Detroit Red Wings and Mike Richards of the Philadelphia Flyers. He finished as second runner-up with one first-place vote.

In the midst of another career year, Kesler signed a six-year, $30 million contract extension with the Canucks on March 19, 2010. The deal was structured to pay Kesler $5 million per season and came a month and a half after general manager Mike Gillis announced he had suspended contract negotiations with all the Canucks' pending free agents until after the 2009–10 season. The Canucks were reportedly looking to sign him at $4.5 million per year while Kesler was asking for $5.5 million. Kesler had made remarks the previous season in March 2009, after Burrows had recently signed a four-year, $2 million per season extension, that more players need to sign contracts below market value in order to develop a winning team. His comments later prompted his agent to refute the idea Kesler would not seek full market value in contract negotiations. Kesler was also contacted by National Hockey League Players' Association director of affairs Glenn Healy, who discouraged Kesler from making similar remarks in the future.

Kesler completed the 2009–10 campaign with a new personal best in points for the third consecutive season with 75 points (25 goals and 50 assists). With Mats Sundin's retirement and Pavol Demitra being held out of the lineup with injuries, Kesler was moved to his natural center position and joined by wingers Mikael Samuelsson and Mason Raymond. His 26 power play points ranked second on the team to Henrik Sedin. Playing on the second power play unit, he earned many of his points controlling the puck along the half-boards. He also averaged a career-high 19:37 minutes of ice time per game, which ranked second among team forwards to Henrik Sedin. In the subsequent 2010 playoffs, Kesler notched a goal and nine assists in 12 games. After helping the Canucks eliminate the Los Angeles Kings in the first round, he played with a sore shoulder in the second round as Vancouver was eliminated by the Chicago Blackhawks for the second consecutive year. An MRI did not reveal any serious injury. He admitted following the defeat to not having played his best during the playoffs.

Following the campaign, he was a Selke Trophy finalist for the second consecutive season, opposite Pavel Datsyuk of the Detroit Red Wings and Jordan Staal of the Pittsburgh Penguins. He ranked second in the league to Datsyuk in takeaways with 83, while blocking 73 shots and recording 95 hits. He lost the award as the first runner-up with 655 voting points, behind Datsyuk's 688.

Also in the off-season, goaltender Roberto Luongo resigned his team captaincy. As Canucks management waited until the beginning of the 2010–11 season to announce his replacement, Kesler was seen by media and fans as a strong candidate, alongside Henrik Sedin. Henrik was eventually named captain prior to the season-opener and Kesler retained his alternate captaincy.

The 2010–11 season marked an expanded focus on Kesler's offensive role. He began the season playing on the power play with the Sedins, as part of an effort by the Canucks coaching staff to "load up" their first power play unit. Switching from being the primary puck-controller on the second unit, he moved to the front of the net, screening the goalie and tipping pucks in. The off-season acquisition of defensive specialist Manny Malhotra also liberated Kesler from a large portion of his defensive duties, such as playing against opposing team's top forwards in a shutdown role. Two months into the campaign, Kesler scored his 100th career NHL goal in a 4–2 win against the Colorado Avalanche on November 24, 2010. He later earned his first NHL career hat-trick, scoring all three of the Canucks' goals in a 3–2 overtime win over the Columbus Blue Jackets on December 15. Nearly a month later, he recorded a second hat-trick against the Edmonton Oilers in a 6–1 win. On January 11, 2011, Kesler was named to his first NHL All-Star Game; he was one of three Canucks along with Daniel and Henrik Sedin. Kesler was chosen to be an alternate captain alongside Washington Capitals defenseman Mike Green representing Eric Staal's team. He went without a point as Team Staal was defeated by Team Lidstrom 11–10. Prior to the Canucks' final home game of the regular season on April 7, 2011, Kesler was presented with the team's Most Exciting Player Award, as voted by the fans. Playing the Minnesota Wild that night, he went on to record his third hat-trick of the season, reaching the 40-goal plateau, as the Canucks won 5–0.

Kesler finished the regular season with a career-high 41 goals; he added 32 assists for 73 points over 82 games, third among Canucks scorers. His efforts helped the Canucks to the franchise's first Presidents' Trophy. After opening the playoffs with a seven-game, first-round victory over the Blackhawks, the Canucks faced the Nashville Predators in the second round. Kesler recorded a point in 11 of the Canucks' 14 goals in the series, leading them past the Predators in six games. He was one point short of Pavel Bure's franchise record of most points in a playoff series (Bure had 12 points in a seven-game series against the St. Louis Blues in 1995). Playing the San Jose Sharks in the third round, Kesler appeared to injure either his left leg or groin while pursuing opposing defenseman Dan Boyle in the series' deciding fifth game. After leaving the bench for several shifts, he returned to score the game-tying goal, tipping a Henrik Sedin shot with 13.2 seconds remaining in regulation. The Canucks went on to win in double-overtime, advancing to the Stanley Cup Finals. Having suffered a torn labrum on the play, Kesler required cortisone shots to continue playing for the remainder of the playoffs (his injury was not revealed until the off-season, however). Prior to the Finals, he was believed by many in the media to be a leading candidate for the Conn Smythe Trophy as playoff MVP.  Consequently, Kesler's performance diminished in the Finals. Playing the Boston Bruins, the Canucks lost the series in seven games. After recording an assist on the game-winning goal in Game 1, he failed to register a point in the remaining six games, while also recording a –7 rating. With 19 points (7 goals and 12 assists) over 25 games, he ranked third among Canucks scorers (behind the Sedins) and tied for sixth among NHL players overall. A week after the Canucks' Game 7 loss, Kesler was awarded the Selke Trophy after finishing as a runner-up the previous two years. He received 1,179 voting points in comparison to runners-up Jonathan Toews' 476 and Pavel Datsyuk's 348. Kesler was also ranked eighth in Hart Memorial Trophy voting as the league's most valuable player. 

Later in the off-season, Kesler underwent arthroscopic surgery for the torn labrum in his hip. Unrelated to his labrum tear in 2007, he had adopted a program to recuperate from the injury naturally until a specialist advised him to have surgery in late-July 2011. The Canucks announced on August 2 that Kesler had successfully undergone the procedure, while it was also reported he would not be ready to play until mid-October. On schedule, he returned to the lineup on October 18 against the New York Rangers after missing the first five games of the 2011–12 season. Appearing in 77 contests, Kesler recorded his lowest scoring total in four years with 22 goals, 27 assists and 49 points. On a team basis, the Canucks remained a successful regular season team, winning their second consecutive Presidents' Trophy. However, the team would sputter in the playoffs due to fatigue, losing in the first round to the eventual champions Los Angeles Kings in five games. Kesler recorded three assists in the series.

During the off-season, it was revealed Kesler had been playing with a shoulder injury since February 2012. Suffering from a torn labrum, he underwent surgery for the injury in May. Initially expected to have recovered by mid-November, his rehabilitation was extended for several months due to an additional wrist injury which he received surgery for in late-June. As a result, he made his 2012–13 season debut on February 15, 2013, in a 4–3 loss to the Dallas Stars. Due to the NHL lockout, which cancelled the first four months of the season, Kesler only missed 12 games. However, within seven games, Kesler was back on the injured reserve with a broken foot. He initially sustained the injury in his first game against Dallas, but subsequent X-rays came back negative. After playing through the pain for several games, an additional CT scan revealed the fracture.

Anaheim Ducks (2014–2019)
On June 27, 2014, Kesler was traded to the Anaheim Ducks, along with a third round pick in the 2015 NHL Entry Draft, in exchange for Nick Bonino, Luca Sbisa and a first- and third-round pick in the 2014 NHL Entry Draft. On July 15, 2015, Kesler signed a six-year contract extension worth $41.25 million. During October 2015, Kesler was named an alternate captain of the Ducks. Kesler placed 3rd in Selke Trophy voting and earned a 5th place vote in the Hart Memorial Trophy race in the 2015–16 NHL season. The following season, Kesler would help lead the Ducks to a Western Conference Final while finishing 2nd in the Selke trophy race and earning his second all-star appearance. He played his 1000th NHL Game on 5 March 2019 against the Arizona Coyotes. He became the 333rd player in NHL History to play 1000 games and the 11th to do so for Anaheim.

In May 2019, Kesler underwent hip resurfacing surgery and missed the entire 2019–20 season. In the fall of 2019, Kesler was diagnosed with Crohn's disease. He also sat out both the 2020–21 and 2021–22 seasons. At the advent of the 2021–22 season, Kesler declared he would not play in the NHL again.

On March 21, 2022, the remainder of Kesler's NHL contract was traded to the Vegas Golden Knights along with John Moore as part of a deal that saw Evgenii Dadonov and a conditional second-round pick in the 2023 or 2024 draft go to Anaheim. However, the trade went into dispute due to Dadonov's no-trade clause. On March 23, the NHL officially cancelled the trade.

International play

Throughout his career, Kesler has represented the United States at various international ice hockey tournaments. He first competed internationally at the 2001 World U-17 Hockey Challenge in New Glasgow and Truro, Nova Scotia, where he helped the American team to a gold medal victory over Team Canada Pacific, finishing the tournament with one goal and five assists in six games.

Kesler participated in his first International Ice Hockey Federation-sanctioned event at the 2002 IIHF World U18 Championships in Piešťany and Trnava, Slovakia. He finished the tournament with seven points in eight games, including two goals in a 10–3 defeat over Canada in the final round. The Americans won their first U18 title, with Kesler being awarded the Best Player Award for the tournament. Later that year, Kesler was named to the United States national junior team for the 2003 World Junior Ice Hockey Championships in Halifax and Sydney, Nova Scotia. He finished the tournament second in team scoring behind Zach Parise with seven points in seven games as the United States lost 3–2 to Finland in the bronze medal game. During the tournament, Kesler was twice named the United States' player of the game: in their quarter-final game versus the Czech Republic and in the bronze medal game versus Finland.

In December 2003, Kesler was released by the Vancouver Canucks to play in the 2004 World Junior Ice Hockey Championships, Kesler's second World Junior tournament. Kesler scored two goals as the Americans went a perfect 4–0 to win Pool A and advance to the semi-finals. There they defeated Finland 2–1, the team that had defeated them in the previous year's bronze medal game, to advance to the gold medal game versus Canada. In the gold medal game, Kesler scored the game-tying goal 6:58 into the third period to even the score at 3–3. After Canadian goaltender Marc-André Fleury cleared the puck off of teammate Braydon Coburn and into his own net, the Americans took the lead 4–3 and went on to win their first IIHF World U20 Championship in the tournament's history. Kesler's play in the tournament was praised as he often took critical faceoffs and played on the Americans' most offensive line despite suffering a facial injury early in the tournament.

Kesler was named to the orientation camp for the American team at the 2006 Winter Olympics in Turin held from September 5–8, 2005 in Colorado Springs, Colorado at World Arena. Kesler, one of the youngest players at the camp, did not make the final roster for the Games. Rather, Kesler made his national men's team debut three months after the Olympics at the 2006 Men's World Ice Hockey Championships in Riga, Latvia. Kesler finished the tournament with one point in seven games, assisting on a Yan Stastny goal in the United States' 3–0 victory versus Denmark. He was named the United States' player of the game in their 6–0 quarter-final loss against Sweden. 

Having developed into a top defensive forward in recent seasons, Kesler was an early candidate to be selected to the American team for the 2010 Winter Olympics in Vancouver, at the time the city in which he played his NHL hockey. The United States played hosts Canada in the final game of the preliminary round to determine top spot in the pool. With United States up by a goal in the final minute, Kesler dove past opposing forward Corey Perry to score an empty-netter and secure the 5–3 win. In a rematch between the two teams during the gold medal game, Canada initially had held a 2-0 lead, but Kesler scored in the second period on a deflection from Patrick Kane to cut the deficit to 2-1, followed by Zach Parise's game-tying goal with 24 seconds left in the third period to send the game into overtime. The United States ultimately lost by a score of 3–2 in overtime on Sidney Crosby's game-winning goal, so Kesler and his teammates settled for the silver medal.

Kesler was also a part of the U.S. men's national team for the 2014 Winter Olympics, where they finished fourth.

Playing style
Kesler is known as a two-way forward, capable of contributing both offensively and defensively. In his first few years in the NHL, he established his role as a shutdown forward, playing on the penalty kill and against opposing teams' top players. He also earned a reputation as an agitator, trash-talking and engaging opponents physically in between play. During the 2008–09 season, Kesler began adding a more offensive component to his game and was moved up to the Canucks' second line from third. With an increased points total, he earned league recognition with his first Selke Trophy nomination as the NHL's best defensive forward. He has since continued to improve his offensive skills while remaining defensively responsible.

Among his most prevalent skills are his speed and wrist shot, the latter of which has improved alongside his recent years of increased offensive production. He is also proficient at taking faceoffs. On the penalty kill, he is an efficient shot blocker, using his body to get in the way of pucks. While competing on the powerplay, he often uses his size and strength to maintain position in front of the opposing net to either screen the goaltender or deflect shots.

Kesler's success as a player has been attributed to his competitiveness and desire to outwork opposing players. Kesler has recognized, however, that his competitive drive has often caused him to lose his composure. In the 2010 off-season, Canucks management encouraged him to play with more focus, maintaining his emotions and decreasing physical and verbal confrontation with opposing players. During the subsequent 2010–11 campaign, he gained media attention for changing his play accordingly while enjoying the best season of his career. Kesler has also credited the change with his role as a father, wanting to set a mature example for his children when they watch him play.

Personal life
Kesler and his wife Andrea have four children. The family resides in Huntington Beach, California during the season. In the off-season, they live in Bloomfield, Michigan. His family's previous offseason residence was nearby, in his hometown of Livonia, Michigan. As of 2009, he kept a Ford Mustang at his parents' home in Livonia, which he enjoyed racing.

Endorsements

In March 2010, Kesler was announced as the cover athlete for the 2K Sports video game NHL 2K11, released several months later in August. He had previously worked with 2K Sports, doing motion capture for NHL 2K10.

In November 2010, Kesler released his own line of sportswear and casual clothing. In partnership with Vancouver-based Firstar Sports, the line was branded "RK17". A promotional photograph of Kesler modeling athletic underwear received considerable media attention in Vancouver and resulted in him being featured in ESPN's Body Issue magazine and named in a feature entitled "Most Beautiful People of B.C." by a local publication.

Career statistics

Regular season and playoffs

International

Awards

International awards

League awards

Team awards

Transactions
June 21, 2003 – Drafted in the first round, 23rd overall by the Vancouver Canucks in the 2003 NHL Entry Draft.
August 18, 2003 – Signed three-year, $2.475-million entry level contract with the Canucks; $850,000 signing bonus.
September 12, 2006 – Signed a one-year, $1.9-million offer sheet with the Philadelphia Flyers.
September 14, 2006 – Signed a one-year, $1.9-million contract with the Canucks.
May 24, 2007 – Signed a three-year, $5.25-million contract extension with the Canucks.
March 19, 2010 – Signed a six-year, $30-million contract extension with the Canucks.
June 27, 2014 - Traded to the Anaheim Ducks for Nick Bonino, Luca Sbisa, a first round pick in the 2014 NHL Entry Draft (Jared McCann) and a third round pick in the 2014 NHL Entry Draft

Notes

References

External links

Ryan Kesler clothing line at RK17.com
The Rise of a Superstar at The Hockey Writers

 |

1984 births
American expatriate ice hockey players in Canada
American men's ice hockey centers
Anaheim Ducks players
Frank Selke Trophy winners
Ice hockey players from Michigan
Ice hockey players at the 2010 Winter Olympics
Ice hockey players at the 2014 Winter Olympics
Living people
Manitoba Moose players
Medalists at the 2010 Winter Olympics
National Hockey League All-Stars
National Hockey League first-round draft picks
Ohio State Buckeyes men's ice hockey players
Olympic silver medalists for the United States in ice hockey
Sportspeople from Livonia, Michigan
USA Hockey National Team Development Program players
Vancouver Canucks draft picks
Vancouver Canucks players